Ángel Fournier Rodríguez (31 December 1987 – 16 March 2023) was a Cuban rower. He finished 12th in the quadruple sculls at the 2008 Summer Olympics, 7th in the single sculls at the 2012 Summer Olympics, then took the silver medal at the 2013 World Rowing Championships. He was 6th in the single sculls at the 2016 Summer Olympics, then at the 2017 World Rowing Championships in Sarasota, Florida, he won silver in the single sculls.

Fournier died from a heart attack on 16 March 2023, at the age of 35.

References

External links

1987 births
2023 deaths
Cuban male rowers
Olympic rowers of Cuba
Rowers at the 2008 Summer Olympics
Rowers at the 2012 Summer Olympics
Sportspeople from Guantánamo
Rowers at the 2007 Pan American Games
Rowers at the 2011 Pan American Games
Rowers at the 2015 Pan American Games
World Rowing Championships medalists for Cuba
Pan American Games gold medalists for Cuba
Pan American Games silver medalists for Cuba
Rowers at the 2016 Summer Olympics
Pan American Games medalists in rowing
Medalists at the 2011 Pan American Games
Medalists at the 2015 Pan American Games